Tapinoma glaucum is a species of ant in the genus Tapinoma. Described by Viehmeyer in 1916, the species is endemic to Singapore.

References

Tapinoma
Hymenoptera of Asia
Insects described in 1916